Luni Cathedral, previously the Pieve of Santa Maria, was located in Luni, in Liguria, Italy, near the port. According to archaeological discoveries the church was built by the Romans in the late 4th and early 5th century and was the centre of the Diocese of Luni.

The cathedral was mentioned for the first time in a document of 879 by Carloman, King of Italy. Up to the 12th century it underwent several restorations before being abandoned along with the city in the early 13th century, when the seat of the Bishop of Luni was transferred to Sarzana, where in the course of time Sarzana Cathedral was built and replaced that of Luni, which eventually fell entirely into ruin. Despite this, until well into the 13th century the bishops of Luni celebrated mass annually in the remains of the old cathedral.

Bibliography

 Cagnana, A., Lusuardi Siena, S., Ricci, R., Varaldo Grottin, F. (2010): Lettura archeologica delle opere murarie nell'area della cattedrale di Luni, in "Archeologia in Liguria", nuova serie II, pp. 179-198
 Durante, A. (1998): Luni, Santa Maria in "A.A.V.V., Archeologia cristiana in Liguria, aree ed edifici di culto tra IV e IX", scheda 28/1.2.3.4 Genova
 Durante, A. M., Gervasini, L. (2000): Luni. Zona Archeologica e Museo Nazionale, in "Itinerari dei musei, gallerie, scavi e monumenti d'Italia”, Roma
 Lusuardi Siena, S. (1989): La cattedrale di S. Maria, in "Luni, Guida Archeologica" (ed. Frova, A.), pp. 120-129
 Lusuardi Siena, S. (2003): Gli scavi nella Cattedrale di Luni nel quadro della topografa cittadina tra tarda antichità e medioevo, in "Liguria Maritima", pp. 195-202

6th-century churches
Former cathedrals in Italy
Roman sites of Liguria
Roman Catholic cathedrals in Italy
Cathedrals in Liguria